The dressing table (also a vanity table or simply a vanity, in Australian English, a duchess) is a table specifically designed for performing one's toilette (dressing, applying makeup and other personal grooming), intended for a bedroom or a boudoir.

Terminology 
The dressing table is one of the examples of a rapid change in terminology. Originally in the 18th century it was called a toilet table, or simply a toilet, occasionally toiletta. However, as the American word "toilet" changed its meaning to describe a water closet somewhere in the 1860s-1870s, the term dressing table (that was in use earlier as well) had quickly replaced the toilet in the US, while the British, with their lavatory, were able to retain the toilet terminology for longer. The word "toilette" comes as a French diminutive form of toile, a cloth that from Medieval times was spread on top of a table prior to using cosmetics. For some time in the 18th century American English contained a spelling variant twilight table.

In the US, a term "lowboy" is used to describe a dressing table with multiple drawers made to match a tall chest, tallboy.

One of the best visual expressions of a connection between the vanity table and vanitas was made by Charles Allan Gilbert in his All Is Vanity (1892).

Bureau dressing table 
A combination of the writing desk and dressing table for the private space first appeared in the early 18th century in a shape of bureau on top of shallow drawers supported by the cabriole legs with toilet mirror above the bureau. By the middle of the 18th century Thomas Chippendale was selling buroe dressing tables that combined the dressing and writing tables with drawers without an actual bureau or built-in mirror.

History 
Adlin traces the history of vanity from the cosmetic box storage box known for a very long time (storage container for ointments, face paints, perfumes was excavated from the tomb of an Egyptian scribe Reniseneb, 15th century BC). The renewed interest in self-adornment during the Renaissance created the étuis and the need for the tabletops to put them on. By the late 17th century the dressing table took its familiar shape. A mirror became an essential part of the dressing table in the middle of the 18th century, it was either mounted in a rotating frame or designed to fold into the table itself.

The dressing table reached peak of its importance and owes it to Marquise de Pompadour who changed the originally private toilette ritual into a morning reception. The time of Marie Antoinette marks an appearance of a specially designed chair, fateuil de toilette, a predecessor of the modern barber chairs. By the end of the 18th century "dressing boxes" on tall legs were designed for men so they can shave while standing.

Dressing tables often featured dressing table sets, a collection of china, porcelain, glass, crystal, or metal objects and receptacles for tools or personal grooming products. These could include a comb, brush, hand mirror, perfume atomizer, buttonhook, powder jar, hatpin holder, a shoehorn, hair receiver and a tray.

In the 21st century, with a few notable exceptions shown at the exhibits, the vanity tables are rarely produced and used; application of makeup occupies just a few moments in front of the bathroom mirror.

Design

Europe 
This light-reflecting set is made almost entirely of the cut crystal and bronze, with candelabras depicting Zephyrus and Flora supporting a rotating mirror (ballet  just got popular).

The evolution of the dressing table naturally followed the furniture styles. For example, in the 19th century in United States, the desks could be found in the English Chippendale style, as well as in a variety of revivalist stylizations, from Elizabethan to Colonial. Charles-Honoré Lannuier after moving to the US in 1803, established a popular "New York" style, mostly based on the Napoleonic one. A brief reign of Art Nouveau freed the dressing table shape from the confines of tradition, yielding striking pieces by Hector Guimard, Louis Majorelle, and Antoni Gaudi.

After an interruption of the First World War, Art Deco took over, with a showcase example of the dressing table produced by one of the leaders of the movement, Émile-Jacques Ruhlmann. His Colonette dressing table plays on the meaning of the toile with a cloth-imitating marquetry, made of ivory and ebony, placed at the center. The Bauhaus modernists of the early 20th century with their clean, occasionally amazingly simple, designs, inspired American designers, like Paul T. Frankl with his skyscraper-themed tables with oversized (semi-)circular mirrors.

In the aftermath of the Second World War, a Good Design movement in the US and Scandinavia called for stylish yet functional and inexpensive products, making the dressing table to become a reality for a middle-class home. For example, a combination writing desk and dressing table by Børge Mogensen (1950) reused the cover of the top drawer as a base of the pop-up mirror and the surface for writing, returning to the concept of the bureau dressing table. In Ettore Sottsass' console and mirror (1965) the shaving surface for men no longer stands on the floor and is hanging on the wall instead. After experiments with new materials in the 1960s and 1970s, the postmodernists like Sottsass and Michael Graves turned to revivalism, now combined with whimsical irony (cf. Graves' Plaza dressing table and stool set).

Japan 
In Japan, women did did not use dressing tables, they were instead kneeling in front of the low "cosmetic stands".

See also 
 Kneehole desk, a small writing desk also designed for a private space

References

Sources 
 
 
 
 
 

Furniture